Penicillium solitum is an anamorph, mesophilic, salinity-tolerant, psychrotolerant species of fungus in the genus Penicillium which produces polygalacturonase, compactin, cyclopenin, cyclopenol, cyclopeptin, dehydrocompactin, dihydrocyclopeptin, palitantin, solistatin, solistatinol, viridicatin, viridicatol. P. Solitum forms dark blueish green colonies that are 22–28 mm in diameter on Czaek yeast extract  and it is brownish orange on malt extract agar.  The orange brown color is unique to P. Solitum and can be used to differentiate it from other similar Penicillium species.  P. Solitum has been historically isolated in numerous places including on cheese rinds,  on cured meats and in the antarctic environment. This species was isolated from air dried lamb thighs, on Faore Island. Penicillium solitum and Eurotium rubrum are the species which are found during the production of traditional produced Tyrolean smoked and cured ham. Penicillium solitum is a pathogen of pomaceous fruit.P. solitum causes blue rot in pome fruits through its production of polygalacturonase, which breaks down the apple’s cell wall.

References

Further reading 
 
 
 
 
 
 
 
 
 
 
 

solitum
Fungi described in 1911